Alexandre Tounde Dimitri Jankewitz (born 25 December 2001) is a Swiss professional footballer who plays as a midfielder for Thun on loan from BSC Young Boys.

Club career

Southampton 
Jankewitz signed his first professional contract in July 2019. On 19 January 2021, he made his first professional appearance for Saints in a 2–0 home victory over Shrewsbury Town in the FA Cup. On 30 January 2021, Jankewitz made his Premier League debut as a substitute for Oriol Romeu in a 1–0 home defeat by Aston Villa.

On 2 February 2021, he was sent off on his first Premier League start within the first two minutes of the away game against Manchester United, for a dangerous tackle on Scott McTominay. Southampton went on to lose the match by a record-equalling score of 9–0. After the defeat, Jankewitz was subjected to racist abuse on social media, which Southampton passed on to Hampshire Police.

Young Boys 
On 12 July 2021, Jankewitz joined BSC Young Boys for an undisclosed fee.

Loan to St. Gallen 
In January 2022, he joined St. Gallen on loan until the end of the season.

Return to Young Boys and loan to Thun 
After returning to Young Boys, Jankewitz made several substitute league appearances and was a starter in three Conference League qualifying games. After Young Boys failed to qualify for the group stage of the competition, on 30 August 2022 Jankewitz moved to Thun on loan.

International career
Born in Switzerland, Jankewitz is of Cameroonian descent. He is a youth international for Switzerland.

Career statistics

Club

References

External links
 
 
 
 

2001 births
People from Vevey
Sportspeople from the canton of Vaud
Swiss people of Cameroonian descent
Swiss sportspeople of African descent
Living people
Swiss men's footballers
Switzerland youth international footballers
Switzerland under-21 international footballers
Association football midfielders
Servette FC players
Southampton F.C. players
BSC Young Boys players
FC St. Gallen players
FC Thun players
Premier League players
Swiss Promotion League players
Swiss Super League players
Swiss Challenge League players
Swiss expatriate footballers
Swiss expatriate sportspeople in England
Expatriate footballers in England